The Star is a 2017 American computer-animated biblical comedy film co-produced by Sony Pictures Animation, Walden Media, Affirm Films, and The Jim Henson Company. The film was directed by Timothy Reckart (in his feature directorial debut), from a screenplay written by Carlos Kotkin, and a story by Kotkin and Simon Moore, based on an original concept by Tom Sheridan. Inspired by the Nativity of Jesus, the film stars the voices of Steven Yeun, Gina Rodriguez, Zachary Levi, Keegan-Michael Key, Kelly Clarkson, Patricia Heaton, Kristin Chenoweth, Tracy Morgan, Tyler Perry, and Oprah Winfrey.

The Star was released by Columbia Pictures through its parental label Sony Pictures Releasing on November 17, 2017, in the United States. The film received mixed reviews from critics and grossed $62 million worldwide with a $20 million budget. It received a nomination for Best Original Song ("The Star" by Mariah Carey) at the 75th Golden Globe Awards but lost to "This Is Me".

Plot
In "9 months B.C.", Mary is visited by an angel telling her she will bear the Messiah. A pygmy jerboa named Abby overhears and tells the other animals as a star begins glowing brightly in the night.

Six months later, a young donkey is tired of milling wheat and wishes to join a traveling royal caravan so that he may feel important. An older donkey helps him escape the miller who owns them, and the young donkey ends up with an injured ankle at the house of Joseph and Mary who have just celebrated their wedding. Mary takes the donkey in and names him Bo, and reveals to Joseph that she is pregnant, with Joseph accepting Mary's situation after praying to God. During this time, Bo and his dove friend Dave plot to escape despite Mary's kindness, but end up staying three more months.

Meanwhile, the three wise men and their camels, Felix, Cyrus, and Deborah, arrive at the home of King Herod. The wise men reveal their gifts of gold, frankincense, and myrrh, but when they reveal that it is actually for the "new King", he sends them on their way to meet him, but secretly sends his royal hunter and his two dogs, Thaddeus and Rufus, to find and kill the new King.

As Joseph and Mary leave Nazareth in order to head to Bethlehem, Bo and Dave try another escape, but are confronted by the dogs, who knew of the home by interrogating Abby. After learning that Joseph and Mary are not home, the hunter and his dogs leave to look for them. Feeling guilty, Bo decides to warn them with Dave joining him. Along the way, they meet a friendly sheep named Ruth who left her flock when she saw the star. They catch up to Joseph and Mary in time to warn them and hide them in a market place where the hunter ties up his dogs. Bo releases the cart Joseph and Mary were using to roll down and cause a chain reaction that knocks the hunter down a well. However, he creates severe damage to the market in the process, and Joseph, unaware of the danger, tells Bo off for his actions.

Upset with being rejected, Bo leaves and Dave follows until they arrive at the royal caravan. While happy to have found it, Bo realizes that he liked being with Mary and tells Dave, who admits that he is not upset and that he just wants Bo to be happy with his decision. Together, the two return and make up with Ruth, and then convince a frustrated Joseph to talk to Mary. Mary admits that it has been difficult for her and that she is scared of the importance of the baby, and they make up when Mary begins having contractions. They arrive at Bethlehem where Joseph is unable to find an inn for Mary. The miller, who just so happened to be there, kidnaps Bo with Dave and Ruth leaving to rescue him. The wise men arrive as well, but the camels, who are aware of Herod's plot, are left tied to a post.

Bo ends up in a stable where he meets a horse named Leah, a cow named Edith, and a goat named Zach. They reveal that they have not been able to sleep because the star's bright light has been shining through on their manger for 9 months. Realizing that this is where the baby is supposed to be, the animals help Bo escape and he catches up with Dave and Ruth while spotting the hunter and his dogs. Bo finds Joseph and Mary and gets them back to the stable while Dave runs into Cyrus, Felix, and Deborah and helps them escape their bonds. Ruth finds her flock, who had previously refused to follow her, and tries to convince them to help, but gets unexpected help from the angel who informs the shepherds and the sheep that the Savior is coming. Bo manages to fight off Thaddeus and Rufus, but is outdone by the hunter. Suddenly, Ruth and her flock, the camels, and Dave arrive and dispatch them by having them hang from a cliff. The hunter lets his dogs fall, but they are saved by Bo while the hunter himself falls to his death.

All of the animals, who are now joined by Abby who assumed the danger to be ongoing, and the redeemed Thaddeus & Rufus, shepherds, and three wise men arrive to see baby Jesus. Bo realizes that he has been carrying the new King the whole time. Deborah predicts that this event will be remembered around the world for years to come. After that, Joseph buys Bo from the miller, and Bo, Dave, and Ruth help him and Mary raise Jesus.

Cast
 Main animal characters
 Steven Yeun as Boaz ("Bo") - A young mill donkey who is loyal yet worrisome. He sees the star one night thinking it is a sign that his life is soon to change. When he hears of the Royal Caravan marching into Nazareth, he feels this is his purpose and escapes to try to join it. But when he encounters Mary, he feels more dedicated to be with her and keep her out of danger.
 Keegan-Michael Key as Dave - A smug and eccentric dove who is Bo's best friend. He joins Bo on his quest to join the Royal Caravan but is more set on that than he is at helping others.
 Aidy Bryant as Ruth - A light-hearted, bubbly, and naïve sheep who left her flock to follow the star. She later joins Bo and Dave on their journey to Bethlehem with Mary and Joseph. At first, she seems to be a nuisance to them, but Bo later grows a soft spot for her and soon becomes friends with her.
 Ving Rhames as Thaddeus - A sinister captive purebred wolf who is determined to find Jesus for his master.
 Gabriel Iglesias as Rufus - An alaunt who is a dimwitted sidekick to Thaddeus.
 Tyler Perry as Cyrus - The intelligent and calm leader of the three camels.
 Tracy Morgan as Felix - The youngest of the three camels. He is shown to be rather goofy and loudmouthed, and often gets into arguments with Cyrus.
 Oprah Winfrey as Deborah - The only female of the three camels. She is the most down-to-earth of the trio, but the other two often think she is crazy despite her attempts at being the voice of reason and keeping her cohorts from making bad choices.
 Patricia Heaton as Edith - A cow who lives at the stable where Mary and Joseph eventually end up at. She is the most level-headed of the animals who reside at the stable and is mostly unamused and pessimistic.
 Kelly Clarkson as Leah - A horse who lives at the stable where Mary and Joseph eventually end up. She loves to sing, but more often than not, her singing is obnoxiously loud, which is most likely caused by her lack of sleep she got since the star began to shine over the stable.
 Anthony Anderson as Zach - A goat who lives at the stable where Mary and Joseph eventually end up at. He has deformed eyes and is very hyper and paranoid due to the lack of sleep he got since the star began to shine over the stable.
 Kristin Chenoweth as Abby - A pygmy jerboa who first witnesses the Angel coming to Mary. She tells her friends about it and tries to warn the others about the hunter.
 Mariah Carey as Rebecca - A chicken at a coop.
 Kris Kristofferson as the Old Donkey - Bo's fellow elderly mill donkey.
 Main human characters
 Gina Rodriguez as Mary - A loving and caring young Hebrew woman soon to be the Mother of Jesus, the Son of God.
 Zachary Levi as Joseph - A usually-pessimistic and paranoid young Hebrew carpenter whom Mary weds, soon to be the personal legal guardian of Jesus. 
 Christopher Plummer as King Herod - The selfish, treacherous, greedy, and sinister king of Judea who hears about the new King who is arriving and sends the three wise men out to find him in Bethlehem while secretly sending his hunter to find and kill him.
 Lex Lang as the Hunter - A large, sinister, yet silent hunter whom King Herod sends out to kill the new King.
 Other Characters
 Phil Morris as the Miller - Bo's former owner who is determined to get him back after he escaped from his mill.
 Joel McCrary as the Angel - The Holy Spirit who tells Mary that she will soon be carrying the Son of God.
 McCrary also voices Zachariah, Elizabeth's husband and John's father.
 Joel Osteen as Caspar - One of the three wise men wearing red and Deborah's owner.
 Phil Morris as Balthazar - One of the three wise men wearing purple and Cyrus' owner.
 Fred Tatasciore as Melchior - One of the three wise men wearing blue and Felix's owner.
 Tatasciore also voices a pottery vendor and an innkeeper.
 Delilah as Elizabeth - Zachariah's wife and John's mother.
 Roger Craig Smith as the Chamberlain
 Joe Whyte as a scribe
 Will Townsend as a Horse and a Goat.
 Gregg Berger, Roger Craig Smith, Melissa Sturm and Joe Whyte as the Innkeepers.

Production
The film's script was originally developed during the late 1990s by the Jim Henson Company, partially inspired by the success of the 1995 film Babe.

In September 2014, it was reported that DeVon Franklin would produce a faith-based film inspired by the Nativity story under his production company, Franklin Entertainment, in collaboration with Sony Pictures Animation. In April 2015, Variety reported that Timothy Reckart would direct the film in his directing debut. On August 5, 2015, it was announced that the film, then titled The Lamb, was given an official release date of December 8, 2017. On June 20, 2016, it was announced that Brian Henson and Lisa Henson from The Jim Henson Company would be executive producers for the film, now titled The Star, making it the first Henson-produced film for Sony since The Adventures of Elmo in Grouchland in 1999.

In an interview with Animation Magazine, Reckart expressed that he felt encouraged to direct the film, as he felt that there was a lack of Christmas films centering on the Nativity of Jesus: "It felt like an opportunity to be part of a movie that has not been done before, that's really going to fill a void."

The animation was produced by Cinesite Studios. Animation work began in January 2017.

Casting
On January 5, 2017, it was reported that Oprah Winfrey and Tyler Perry would be in the film. The rest of the cast was announced on January 19, 2017.

Soundtrack

The Star (Original Motion Picture Soundtrack) was released on October 27, 2017, including contributions from Jessie James Decker, Jake Owen, Kelsea Ballerini, Zara Larsson, Casting Crowns, Kirk Franklin, Fifth Harmony, Yolanda Adams, Saving Forever and Mariah Carey. Pentatonix also contributes a bonus track to the digital release of the album. The main single The Star, interpreted by Mariah Carey ranked at No. 6 on the Billboard US Holiday Digital Song Sales in 2017. The song was nominated for the Best Original Song at the 75th Golden Globe Awards.

Release
In July 2016, the release date was set for November 10, 2017, but it was later pushed back to November 17, 2017. The Star had its world premiere in Los Angeles at the Regency Village Theater on November 12, 2017.

Marketing
The first trailer was released on July 26, 2017. On November 16, 2017, the official video for the song The Star, performed by Mariah Carey, was made available on her YouTube channel.

Home media
The Star was released on digital on February 6, 2018, and on DVD and Blu-ray on February 20, 2018, by Sony Pictures Home Entertainment.

Reception

Box office
The Star has grossed $40.9 million in the United States and Canada, and $22 million in other territories, for a worldwide total of $62.8 million, against a production budget of $20 million.

In the United States and Canada, The Star was released alongside Justice League, Wonder and Roman J. Israel, Esq. and was projected to gross around $10 million from 2,800 theaters in its opening weekend. The film made $2.8 million on its first day. It ended up grossing $9.8 million in its opening weekend, finishing 6th at the box office.

Critical response
On review aggregation website Rotten Tomatoes, the film has an average rating by critics of 42% based on 52 reviews, with an average rating of 4.94/10. The site's critical consensus reads, "The Star may not leave audiences singing 'Hallelujah', but its offbeat yet sincere approach to the nativity story makes for acceptably diverting holiday viewing." On Metacritic, which assigns a normalized rating to reviews, the film has a weighted average score of 42 out of 100, based on 12 critics, indicating "mixed or average reviews". Audiences polled by CinemaScore gave the film an average grade of "A" on an A+ to F scale.

The A.V. Clubs Ignatiy Vishnevetsky criticized The Star as a "rote cartoon feature" existing for purely commercial reasons: "...even the kid-friendliest, Sunday-school-iest kind of religious art can't spring from religion alone; it needs artistry, too. Otherwise, you end up with a generic product aimed at a market segment who'll buy anything as long as it seems sufficiently churchy."

Accolades

See also
 List of Christmas films
 Christmas in the media
 The Night the Animals Talked

References

External links
 
  at Sony Pictures Animation
 

2017 films
2017 computer-animated films
2010s American animated films
2010s Christmas films
Christian animation
American children's animated adventure films
American children's animated comedy films
American children's animated fantasy films
American Christmas films
2010s English-language films
Animated Christmas films
Animated films about animals
Films about donkeys
Films about the Nativity of Jesus
Columbia Pictures animated films
Columbia Pictures films
Walden Media films
Sony Pictures Animation films
The Jim Henson Company films
Affirm Films films
2010s Christmas comedy films
2017 directorial debut films
2017 comedy films
Films scored by John Paesano